Trap God 2 is a mixtape by American rapper Gucci Mane, released on February 12, 2013. The mixtape features guest appearances from Young Scooter, Wiz Khalifa, Lil Wayne, Young Thug, Big Bank Black, OG Boo Dirty, Waka Flocka Flame, PeeWee Longway, Young Dolph, Rulet 1017, Verse Simmonds, Rocko and Lloyd.

Background
On December 27, 2012, the first song was released in promotion of the mixtape titled "Nothin' On Ya" featuring Wiz Khalifa. On January 4, the second song was released in promotion of the mixtape titled "Squad Car" featuring Big Bank Black and OG Boo Dirty. On January 19, 2013, during an interview with XXL Gucci Mane announced he would be releasing a sequel to his popular mixtape "Trap God", saying "I’m in the studio. Working on my mixtape, Trap God 2 I’m dropping that on Spring Break. I’ve got a movie coming out Spring Breakers, so I’m dropping Trap God 2: Spring Break Edition to coincide with the movie." On February 3, 2013, it was announced the mixtape would be released on February 12, 2013. On February 5, the third song was released in promotion of the mixtape titled "Handicap" featuring Big Bank Black. On February 11, 2013, the fourth song was released in promotion of the mixtape titled "Breakfast" featuring PeeWee Longway and Waka Flocka Flame A music video for the song "Servin'" was released on February 6, 2013. It has since had over 2 million views on YouTube. On February 11, 2013, the music video was released for "Squad Car" featuring Big Bank Black and OG Boo Dirty. On March 28, 2013, the music video was released for "Nothin' On Ya" featuring Wiz Khalifa. The music video for "Break Dancin'" featuring Young Thug was released on May 17, 2013.

Commercial performance
The mixtape sold 2,900 copies in the United States during its first week, which was not enough to chart.

Track listing

Charts

References

2013 mixtape albums
Gucci Mane albums
Albums produced by Lex Luger
Albums produced by Honorable C.N.O.T.E.
Albums produced by Drumma Boy
Albums produced by Zaytoven
Albums produced by Mike Will Made It
Sequel albums
Albums produced by FKi (production team)
Albums produced by TM88